KEDO may refer to:

 Korean Peninsula Energy Development Organization
 KEDO (AM), a radio station (1270 AM) licensed to serve Longview, Washington, United States
 KBAM (AM), a radio station (1400 AM) licensed to serve Longview, Washington, which held the call sign KEDO from 1958 to 2021